Kaakan is a Marathi language movie released in 2015 directed by Kranti Redkar starring Jitendra Joshi and Urmila Kanitkar on lead roles.

Cast 
 Jitendra Joshi
 Urmila Kanitkar
 Ashutosh Gaikwad
 Ashok Shinde 
 Madhavi Juvekar

Release and reception 
Kaakan was released on 10 April 2015. Pune Mirror rated the movie with two and a half star saying that Kaakan would be only appealing to a specific type of audience, which prefers a quick dose of emotional melodrama.

Music 
Soundtracks for Kaakan is composed by debut music director Ajay Singha.

References

External links 
 

2015 films
2010s Marathi-language films
2015 directorial debut films